Manhattanhenge, also inaccurately called the Manhattan Solstice, is an event during which the setting sun or the rising sun is aligned with the east blue of the main street grid of Manhattan, New York City. The astrophysicist Neil deGrasse Tyson has said that he coined the term, by analogy with Stonehenge. The sunsets and sunrises each align twice a year, on dates evenly spaced around the summer solstice and winter solstice. The sunset alignments occur around May 28 and July 13. The sunrise alignments occur around December 5 and January 8. 

Manhattan is a particularly remarkable place to view a phenomenon of this kind, due to its extensive urban canyons and its rectilinear street grid that is rotated 29° clockwise from true east–west. Excellent places for viewing Manhattanhenge include 14th, 23rd, 34th, 42nd, and 57th Streets.

Explanation and details

The term Manhattanhenge is a reference to Stonehenge, a prehistoric monument located in Wiltshire, England, which was constructed so that the rising sun, seen from the center of the monument at the time of the summer solstice, aligns with the outer "Heel Stone".  The phenomenon (but not the term "Manhattanhenge") was described by Neil deGrasse Tyson, an astrophysicist at the American Museum of Natural History and a native New Yorker in 1997 in the magazine Natural History. In a later interview, Tyson stated that he coined the term, and that it was inspired by a childhood visit to Stonehenge on an expedition headed by Gerald Hawkins, an astronomer who was the first to propose Stonehenge's purpose as an ancient astronomical observatory used to predict movements of sun and stars, as outlined in his 1965 book Stonehenge Decoded. According to Tyson,

In accordance with the Commissioners' Plan of 1811, the street grid for most of Manhattan is rotated 29° clockwise from true east-west. Thus, when the azimuth for sunset is 299° (i.e., 29° north of due West), the sunset aligns with the streets on that grid. This rectilinear grid design runs from north of Houston Street in Lower Manhattan to south of 155th Street (Manhattan) in Upper Manhattan. A more impressive visual spectacle, and the one commonly referred to as Manhattanhenge, occurs a couple of days after the first such date of the year, and a couple of days before the second date, when a pedestrian looking down the centerline of the street westward toward New Jersey can see the full solar disk slightly above the horizon and in between the profiles of the buildings. The date shifts are due to the sunset time being when the last of the sun just disappears below the horizon.

The precise dates of Manhattanhenge depend on the date of the summer solstice, which varies from year to year, but remains close to June 21. In 2014, the "full sun" Manhattanhenge occurred on May 30 at 8:18 p.m., and on July 11 at 8:24 p.m. The event has attracted increasing attention in recent years.

The dates on which sunrise aligns with the streets on the Manhattan grid are evenly spaced around the winter solstice and correspond approximately to December 5 and January 8.

Occurrences

In the following table, "full sun" refers to occurrences of the full solar disk just above the horizon, and "half sun" refers to occurrences of the solar disk partially hidden below the horizon.

Related phenomena in other cities
The same phenomenon happens in other cities with a uniform street grid and an unobstructed view of the horizon. If the streets on the grid were rigorously north-south and east-west, then both sunrise and sunset would be aligned on the days of the vernal and autumnal equinoxes (which occur around March 20 and September 23 respectively). In Baltimore, for instance, sunrise aligns on March 25 and September 18 and sunset on March 12 and September 29. In Chicago, the setting sun lines up with the grid system on March 20 and September 25, a phenomenon dubbed Chicagohenge.

In Toronto, the setting sun lines up with the east–west streets on February 16 and October 25, a phenomenon now known locally as Torontohenge. In Montreal, there is a Montrealhenge each year around June 12.

When the architects designing the city centre of Milton Keynes, in the United Kingdom, discovered that its main street almost framed the rising sun on Midsummer Day and the setting sun on Midwinter Day, they consulted Greenwich Observatory to obtain the exact angle required at their latitude, and persuaded their engineers to shift the grid of roads a few degrees.

In Cambridge, Massachusetts, MIThenge occurs about January 29 and November 11, when the setting sun may be seen across the length of the "Infinite Corridor" at the Massachusetts Institute of Technology.

In Strasbourg, the Strasbourghenge occurs in October where the rising sun seen from the A351 motorway lines up with the spire of the cathedral.

See also
 Stonehenge replicas and derivatives
 Street canyon

References

External links

Media
Flickr photos tagged with Manhattanhenge
Video interpretation of Manhattanhenge
Video on Science Friday website
Manhattanhenge, NOVA scienceNOW, first broadcast September 14, 2006

Discussion
 Hayden Planetarium discussion

Images and maps
Manhattanhenge images on Yahoo! news July 12, 2011
Interactive map showing Manhattanhenge visibility by time of year

Astronomical events of the Solar System
Culture of Manhattan
2000s neologisms
May events
July events
Geography of Manhattan
Neil deGrasse Tyson
Solar alignment
Solar phenomena